LaQuan McGowan (born March 4, 1993) is a former American football fullback and offensive tackle. He played college football at Baylor and later had stints in the Canadian Football League (CFL) and National Arena League (NAL).

High school career
McGowan played high school football at Boys Ranch High School at Boys Ranch, Texas. He was rated the 92nd best offensive tackle by ESPN.com.

Professional career
McGowan went undrafted in the NFL. He signed with the CFL's Montreal Alouettes but was waived soon after. Later in 2017, he signed with the Triangle Torch, then, following the season, he was released. Lastly he played with the Carolina Cobras for the 2018 year.

References

Further reading

1993 births
Living people
American football fullbacks
American football offensive tackles
Players of American football from Texas
Baylor Bears football players
Montreal Alouettes players
Triangle Torch players
Carolina Cobras players